This article lists notable former pupils of Stonyhurst College in Lancashire, England, and its lineal antecedents at St Omer, Bruges and Liège. Former pupils are referred to in school contexts as O.S. (Old Stonyhurst). Inter alia the school counts among its most distinguished former pupils: three Saints, twelve Beati, twenty-two martyrs, seven archbishops, and seven Victoria Cross winners.

Alumni of the College at St Omer, Bruges, & Liège (1593–1794)

Saints, beati and martyrs
St Philip Evans SJ, executed at Cardiff in 1679.

St Thomas Garnet SJ, protomartyr of St Omer, one of the Forty Martyrs of England and Wales, executed at Tyburn in 1608.
St John Plessington, executed at Chester in 1679.
Bl. Edward Bamber, executed at Lancaster in 1646.
Bl. William Barrow SJ (aka Fr Harcourt), executed at Tyburn in 1679.
Bl. Arthur Bell OSF, executed at Tyburn in 1643.
Bl. Ralph Corbie, executed at Tyburn in 1644.
Bl. John Fenwick SJ, executed at Tyburn in 1679.

Bl. John Gavan SJ, executed at Tyburn in 1679.
Bl. Thomas Holland SJ, executed at Tyburn in 1642.
Bl. William Ireland SJ, executed at Tyburn in 1679.
Bl. Thomas Thwing, executed at York in 1680.
Bl. Thomas Whitaker, executed at Lancaster in 1646.
Bl. Thomas Whitbread SJ, executed at Tyburn in 1679.
Bl. John Woodcock OSF, executed at Lancaster in 1646.

Others
Prince Louis Aloy de Hohenlohe-Waldenburg-Bartenstein, General, Marshal of France. 
Francis Baines, English Jesuit educated at Colleges of St Omer
Henry Blundell, art collector; owner of the largest private art collection in England.

Hon. Aedanus Burke, soldier, judge and United States Representative from South Carolina. Served in the militia forces of South Carolina during the American Revolutionary War. Appointed judge of the State circuit court; member of the South Carolina House of Representatives; served in the Revolutionary Army. Appointed one of three commissioners to prepare a digest of the State laws; member of the convention in 1788 called to consider ratification of the Constitution of the United States, which he opposed. Elected as an Anti-Administration candidate to the First United States Congress; elected a chancellor of the courts of equity; senior member of the South Carolina appellate courts; Chief Justice of South Carolina.
Philip Calvert, Keeper of the Conscience of Maryland; Governor of Maryland.
Charles Carroll of Carrollton, last surviving and only Catholic signer of the U.S. Declaration of Independence, delegate to the Continental Congress and later US Senator for Maryland.
Daniel Carroll, American Roman Catholic who helped draft the United States Constitution.
Rt. Rev. John Carroll, first Roman Catholic bishop in the United States of America; first Archbishop of Baltimore, founder of Georgetown University and the Georgetown Preparatory School; John Carroll University is named in his honour.
John Caryll, 1st Baron Caryll of Durford, in the Jacobite Peerage, poet, dramatist, and diplomat. Translated Ovid's Epistle of Briseïs to Achilles and Virgil's first Eclogue. During the "Popish Plot" was committed to the Tower of London, but was soon let out on bail. When James II of England succeeded to the throne, he sent him as his agent to the court of Pope Innocent XI. Secretary to Queen Mary of Modena, after the Glorious Revolution, he followed the exiled royal family to Saint-Germain. Implicated in a plots to overthrow William of Orange (William III), whilst in exile he was created by the dethroned James II Baron Caryll of Durford (or Dunford) in West Sussex and appointed his Joint Secretary of State. His son, the so-called Old Pretender, James Francis Edward Stuart, recognised by Jacobites as "King James III and VIII", re-appointed him one of his Secretaries of State.

Christopher G. Champlin, United States Representative and Senator from Rhode Island; elected as a Federalist to the Fifth and Sixth Congresses; president of the Rhode Island Bank.
Fr Ambrose Corbie, Jesuit teacher and author; appointed confessor at the English College, Rome.
Sir Henry Gage, Royalist Governor of Oxford during the Civil War.
Fr Thomas Gage, recusant Catholic, clergyman, ordained Dominican priest; later publicly abandoned the Catholic Church; testified against Thomas Holland, Francis Bell, Ralph Corby and Peter Wright (qvv), all of whom were executed on his evidence. During the English Civil War, he aligned himself with Oliver Cromwell.
William Habington, poet, works include Castara (1634), The Queen of Arragon (1640) and Observations upon History (1641).

Fr Francis Hawkins, Jesuit, child prodigy and translator; translated (at age 10) An Alarum for Ladyes and (at age 13) from de La Serre's Youths Behaviour, or, Decency in Conversation amongst Men (1641).
Fr. Emmanuel Lobb, SJ, received King James II into the Catholic Church.
William Kilty (1757–1821), Federal Judicial Service: Chief Judge, Circuit Court of the District of Columbia USCC. Received a recess appointment from Thomas Jefferson on 23 March 1801, to a new seat created by 2 Stat. 103; nominated on 6 January 1802. Confirmed by the Senate on 26 January 1802, and received commission on 26 January 1802. Service terminated on 27 January 1806, due to resignation. Compiler, Laws of Maryland, State of Maryland, 1798–1800; State Governor, Maryland, 1806–21
Thomas Lloyd, stenographer; known as the "Father of American Shorthand", published the most complete and official record of the First Continental Congress from the notes taken in his shorthand; worked for the United States Treasurer; reported the first Inaugural Address given by George Washington.
William Matthews, President of Georgetown College and Vicar General of the Diocese of Philadelphia; the first person born in British America to be ordained a Catholic priest.
Fr Henry More, Jesuit provincial and church historian; great-grandson St Thomas More; sent on the English Mission where he was twice arrested and imprisoned, whilst chaplain to Lord Petre; as provincial negotiationed with Panzani, Conn and Rossetti (the papal agents at the court of Queen Henrietta Maria); Rector of St Omer.
Arthur Murphy, author, biographer and barrister, also known by the pseudonym Charles Ranger; friend of Henry Thrale and Samuel Johnson; introduced Thale to Johnson; Commissioner of Bankruptcy; coined the legal term "wilful misconstruction".
Rt. Rev. Leonard Neale, the first Roman Catholic bishop ordained in the United States, second Archbishop of Baltimore, President of Georgetown University.
Fr Edward Petre SJ, Jesuit, Privy Councillor during the reign of James II.
Ambrose Rookwood, Gunpowder Plotter; executed in 1606 at Westminster with Guy Fawkes.
Fr Marmaduke Stone, Jesuit Provincial (England, Ireland and Maryland), first President of Stonyhurst.
Fr Louis de Sabran, French Jesuit, associated with the court of James II, engaged in vigorous theological debates with both Church of England and Puritan spokesmen; royal chaplain to James II; chaplain to the infant Prince of Wales; visitator of the Neapolitan Jesuits; provincial superior; rector of St Omer; spiritual father of the English College in Rome.
Sir Charles Talbot, 1st Duke of Shrewsbury (1660–1718); a signatory to the letter of invitation to William of Orange 1688; Secretary of State for the Southern Department; Lord Chamberlain; Ambassador to France; Lord Lieutenant of Ireland; Lord Treasurer; Knight of the Garter and Privy Counsellor (Reference St Omers, Bruge and Liege Lists. Published by Catholic Record Society)
Fr Anthony Terill, Jesuit theologian, academic, educator at Florence, Parma, and at the English College, Liège.
James White, American physician, lawyer and politician; early settler Tennessee and Louisiana; delegate for North Carolina in the Continental Congress and a non-voting member of the U.S. House for the Southwest Territory.

Alumni of the College at Stonyhurst (1794–present)

Alumni

Victoria Cross Holders
Seven Stonyhurst Alumni have won the Victoria Cross. 
Victoria Cross
Malakand Frontier War, India 1897
Lieutenant Edmond William Costello V.C.
Sudan Campaign 1898
Captain Paul Aloysius Kenna V.C.
World War I
Lieutenant Maurice James Dease V.C. (first VC of the Great War)
Captain John Aiden Liddell V.C.
Second Lieutenant Gabriel George Coury V.C.
World War II
Captain Harold Marcus Ervine-Andrews V.C.
Captain James Joseph Bernard Jackman V.C.

Others
Joe Ansbro, Scottish rugby international
George Archer-Shee, cause célèbre; his case was the inspiration for the play The Winslow Boy.
James Arundell, 10th Baron Arundell of Wardour, admitted to the House of Lords with the Roman Catholic Relief Act 1829.
Alfred Austin, Poet Laureate.
Brittany Ashworth, British film and theatre actress, best known for her roles in Mrs Ratcliffe's Revolution and The Crucifixion. 
Patrick Baladi, British actor.
Iain Balshaw, English Rugby International, British and Irish Lion and World Cup Winner.
Marmaduke Constable-Maxwell, 11th Lord Herries of Terregles Lord Lieutenant of East Riding of Yorkshire and of Kirkcudbrightshire 
Joseph Cyril Bamford, British entrepreneur (founded J. C. Bamford Excavators Ltd.).

Philip Bell, Member of Parliament (Conservative).
Count Michael de la Bédoyère, author and journalist, editor of the Catholic Herald.
John Desmond Bernal, FRS, scientist known for pioneering X-ray crystallography, Master of Birkbeck, University of London, Professor of Physics and Crystallography, Fellow of the Royal Society, Communist, awarded the Lenin Peace Prize, joint inventor of the Mulberry Harbour.

George Powys, 7th Baron Lilford landowner and member of the House of Lords
Fr Charles Boarman, S.J., sub-editor of Jesuit publication, The Month; founding rector of the mission of St Wilfred, Longridge.
Sir Wilfrid Scawen Blunt (1840–1922), diplomat, poet, traveler; opposed British rule in Egypt and British policy in the Sudan; Muslim sympathiser; championed Irish Home Rule; founder of Crabbet Arabian Stud.
HRH Prince Felix of Bourbon-Parma, consort of Charlotte, Grand Duchess of Luxembourg. 
Kyran Bracken, English Rugby International, British and Irish Lion and World Cup Winner. Captained England briefly. 
Fr Charles Brigham, S.J., author of The Enormities of the Confessional Examined.

Sir Edward Bulfin KCB CVO, general during World War I, established a reputation as an excellent commander; noted for his actions during the First Battle of Ypres, when he organized impromptu forces to slow down the German assault.
Mullah John Butt, Broadcaster and Cambridge University Islamic chaplain.
Fr Brendan Callaghan, SJ, Master of Campion Hall, Oxford.
William Cash, Member of Parliament (Conservative), Shadow Attorney General.
Pratap Chitnis, Baron Chitnis, Life Peer; Chief Executive/Director of the Liberal Party.
Sir Charles Clifford, New Zealand politician, first Speaker of the House of Representatives.

Hugh Clifford, 7th Baron Clifford of Chudleigh, Whig politician, leading advocate of Catholic Emancipation; accompanied Cardinal Consalvi to the Congress of Vienna.
Colin Clive, actor (Frankenstein; Journey's End)
Sir Cecil Clothier, Judge of Appeal of the Isle of Man; Parliamentary Ombudsman.
Charles Allston Collins, artist and author, proposed for membership of the Pre-Raphaelite Brotherhood but was rejected.
Bernard Dobson, first-class cricketer. 
Sir Arthur Conan Doyle, writer, novelist; creator of Sherlock Holmes.
John Coope, MBE (1929–2006), physician; founder of the Bollington Arts Centre and the Bollington Festival.
John D. Cronin, M.P. (Labour).
Edward Micklethwaite Curr, Australian pastoralist and squatter.
John da Cunha, barrister and judge, member of the British delegation to the Nuremberg War Crimes Tribunal.
Baron Devlin of West Wick, Lord of Appeal in Ordinary; High Steward of the University of Cambridge; Privy Counsellor; legal writer and moral philosopher.
Fr William Doyle, S.J., chaplain to the 8th Royal Irish Fusiliers 16th (Irish) Division during the First World War, awarded the Military Cross, subject of a canonisation petition.

Charles Gavan Duffy (1855–1932), Australian public servant, Assisted drafting the Commonwealth of Australia's Constitution; Clerk of the House of Representatives; Clerk of the Senate.
Sir Frank Gavan Duffy, Chief Justice of the High Court of Australia.
John Gavan Duffy (1844–1917), Australian solicitor and politician, Member of the Legislative Assembly; President of the Board of Land and Works, Commissioner of Crown Lands and Survey and Minister of Agriculture; Postmaster-General; Attorney-General.
Archibald Matthias Dunn, Catholic ecclesiastical architect.
Manuel Escandón y Barrón, Marqués de Villavieja, Mexican entrepreneur and sportsman, introduced polo to Spain and Latin America.
Pablo Escandón y Barrón, Governor of Morelos (Mexico) and aide-de-camp of President Porfirio Díaz.
Frank Foley, British soldier and secret agent during World War II. He was hailed as the "British Schindler". As an undercover passport control officer he helped thousands of Jews escape from Nazi Germany. In October 1999 he was accorded the status of a Righteous Among the Nations by Israel's Yad Vashem.

Gerald Gallagher, Colonial Administrator Service, noted as the first officer-in-charge of the Phoenix Islands Settlement Scheme, the last colonial expansion of the British Empire.
Eulogio Gillow y Zavala, Archbishop of Antequera (Oaxaca, Mexico).
Peter Glenville, film and theatre director and producer and script writer; winner BAFTA (Best British Film – "Becket"); nominated for 4 Tony Awards, 2 Golden Globe Awards, 1 Academy Award "Oscar" (Best Director) and 1 Golden Lion.

Oliver St John Gogarty, Irish poet, writer and wit; Irish Free State Senator.
Maurice Gorham, journalist and broadcaster; Controller of BBC Television Service.
Michael Gough, archaeologist.
Morgan Grace, Member of the Legislative Council (New Zealand), Member of Parliament
Matt Greenhalgh, screenwriter and BAFTA winner
Richard Gwyn, Canadian civil servant, journalist and author, awarded the Order of Canada
Archduke Franz Karl Habsburg, Austrian noble
Sir William Hackett, Chief Justice of the Supreme Court, Ceylon (present-day Sri Lanka)
John Harbison, first State Pathologist of Ireland
Macdonald Hastings, British journalist; World War II war correspondent
Tim Hetherington, British photojournalist and documentary maker,
Sir Michael Joseph Hogan, Chief Justice of Hong Kong
William Horton, English cricketer; represented Middlesex and the Europeans in India
Sir John Hughes (1857–1912), Australian solicitor and politician; Knight Commander of the Order of St Gregory; Member of the Legislative Council; Vice-President of the Executive Council; Minister of Justice
Sir Thomas Hughes, first Lord Mayor of Sydney. Edward VII conferred the title of Lord Mayor on the position  of Mayor; the first Lord Mayoralty created outside the British Isles
Michael D. Hurley, academic at Cambridge who works on literature, philosophy and theology
Giles Hussey, artist, painted a number of portraits, specializing in drawings in profile. Examples of his portraiture in oils include a portrait of Sir John Swinburne and a portrait of William Meredith
Leonard Ingrams, founder of the Garsington Opera Festival
Albert Isola, Gibraltarian politician; Minister for Financial Services and Gaming 
Peter Isola, Gibraltarian politician; member of the House of Assembly; leader of the Democratic Party of British Gibraltar; Minister for Education; Leader of the Opposition; Deputy Chief Minister; appeared before the UN to resist demand to integrate Gibraltar into Spain
Valentine Irwin, introduced polo to the British Isles
Dom Bede Jarrett, Provincial of the Dominican Order
Paul Johnson, journalist, editor of the New Statesman
Richard 'Rick' Jolly, Royal Navy surgeon and South Atlantic war veteran
Bruce Kent, British peace campaigner; chairman of the CND; laicised priest
Miles Gerard Keon, journalist, novelist, Colonial secretary and lecturer
Thomas Kenny, Canadian Member of Parliament (Conservative Party)
The Hon. Charles Langdale, one of the foremost leaders of Catholic Emancipation Days, Member of Parliament (Whig), wrote the memoirs of Maria Fitzherbert
Charles Laughton, actor, director; nominee for Oscar, Golden Globe and Grammy awards
Professor Gabriel Leung, GBS, JP, former Director of the Chief Executive's Office in Hong Kong, former Under-secretary for Food and Health of Hong Kong
James Lomax, Lord of the Manor of Great Harwood, benefactor of Stonyhurst College
Eduardo López de Romaña, President of Peru (brother of Alejandro López de Romaña, see above)
Giuseppe Lorenzo 6th Marquis de Piro, Chamberlain to Pope Leo XIII, Knight of Malta
Robert Loughnan, Member of the Legislative Council (New Zealand), Member of Parliament, journalist, critic and inventor.
Enoch Louis Lowe, Governor of the state of Maryland (USA) (1851–1854)
Dermot MacDermot, Prince of Coolavin 
Henry McGee, British actor
Thomas Francis Meagher, Irish nationalist politician; Member of Parliament (Repeal Party); reportedly first introduced the tricolour to Ireland from France; General in the American Civil War, later Governor of the state of Montana
James Monahan, Director of the Royal Ballet School 
Joseph Sheridan Moore (1828–1891), Australian teacher, publicist
Anthony Moorhouse, abducted and murdered by Egyptians during the Crisis.
Chris Morris, satirist and comedian; creator of "Brass Eye" (brother of Tom Morris; see below)
Tom Morris, Artistic Director of Bristol Old Vic; Associate Director of popular stage play War Horse (brother of Chris Morris; see above)
Bryan Mullanphy, U.S. philanthropist who established a collection of Native American artefacts (now held in the British Museum); alderman, judge and one-time mayor of St. Louis, Missouri
Gonzalo de Aguilera Munro, Falangist politician and military leader, war criminal and responsible for Massacre of Badajoz
Francis Neale, (d. 1837) President of Georgetown University (1806-7)
John Nolan, Irish Nationalist politician; Member of Parliament (Irish Parliamentary Party)
Michael O'Donnell, British physician, journalist and broadcaster
Barry O'Driscoll, Irish Rugby international (elder brother of John O'Driscoll, see below)
John O'Driscoll, Irish Rugby international, British and Irish Lion (younger brother of Barry O'Driscoll, see above)
Rt Hon Richard More O'Ferrall, Member of Parliament (Whig) and Privy Counsellor, he and the Archbishop of Dublin were the only Catholics to sit on the Royal Commission to report into the condition of the poor in Ireland; adviser to the Catholic University. In 1835, under Lord Melbourne he was appointed Lord of the Treasury, First Secretary of the Admiralty; Secretary to the Treasury; he was the first civilian to hold the post of Governor of Malta.
Brendan O'Friel, Governing Governor of HM Prison Service, Governor of HM Prison Strangeways (renamed Manchester) during the "Strangeways riots"
Henry O'Hara (1853–1921), Australian surgeon
Valentine O'Hara (1875–1941), noted author and authority on Russia and The Baltic States
Dr. George Oliver, antiquary and Church annalist 
Sir Bernard Partridge, Punch cartoonist
Hubert Patch, Air Chief-Marshal, Chief of Fighter Command
John Pinasco, President of the University of San Francisco
Fr Charles Plowden, Jesuit, Rector of Stonyhurst, writer and orator
Francis Plowden, barrister, writer, academic; Professor at the Scots College, Paris
Jonathan Plowright, concert pianist, Gold Medalist at the Royal Academy of Music and a Fulbright Scholar; winner of the European Piano Competition
Joseph Mary Plunkett, Irish rebel; helped compose the Proclamation of Independence, to which he was a signatory; executed for his role in the 1916 Easter Rising
George Oliver Plunkett, younger brother of Joseph Plunkett (see above), Irish republican (during 1916–1940).
George Porter, Archbishop of Bombay
Patrick Power, MP for the Eastern Division of Waterford
Anthony Rickards, British cardiologist who devised a revolutionary pacemaker that responded to the demands of the body during exercise and foreshadowed the technology used in nearly all pacemakers; also created the first computerised cardiac database in Britain; helped establish the Central Cardiac Audit Database
John Rogers (1842–1908), Australian educationist and politician; Member of the Legislative Assembly<ref>Australian Dictionary of National Biography</ref>
John Gage Rokewode, antiquarian, Fellow of the Royal Society; Fellow, and later Director, Society of Antiquaries
Ted Russell, Irish senator, businessman and five times Mayor of Limerick City
Victor Santa Cruz, Chilean law professor, member of the Chilean Congress (1945-1949), Chilean Ambassador to the United Kingdom (1958-1970)
Sir Edward Strickland, CB, Army officer, author, vice-president of the Geographical Society of Australasia, a founder and president of the society's New South Wales branch, president of the Australian Geographical Conference in 1884 and vice-president of the Australasian Association for the Advancement of Science; Promoted to Commissary-General (ranking with Major-General); served in Ireland as senior commissariat officer. The Strickland River in New Guinea is named after him
Charles Sturridge, British film/television director (best known for the television adaptation of Brideshead Revisited)
Francis L. Sullivan, British-American actor, known for his portrayals of Dickensian characters such as Jaggers in Great Expectations and Bumble in David Lean's Oliver Twist (1948).
Major Francis Suttill, British special agent who worked for the Special Operations Executive (SOE) inside France; organized and coordinated the Physician network, better known by his own code name "Prosper"; captured and killed by the Nazis
John Talbot, 16th Earl of Shrewsbury
Mark Thompson, Director General of the BBC
William Tobin (1859–1904), Australian Cricket International player
Sir Colman Treacy, British jurist, Birmingham Crown Court
Arthur Turcotte, Quebec lawyer, journalist and politician; Mayor of Trois-Rivières; member of the Legislative Assembly of Quebec (independent Conservative; later Liberal); Speaker of the Assembly; helped found La Concorde, becoming its editor; minister without portfolio and attorney general under Honoré Mercier; appointed protonotary for the Superior Court in Montreal district
Sir Edgar Unsworth, KC, QC, CMG, KBE, British lawyer and judge; Chief Justice of Gibraltar and Attorney-General for Northern Rhodesia
Fr Bernard Vaughan, Jesuit social reformer who worked among the poor of Westminster and in the East End.  His sermons on "The Sins of Society" attracted large audiences. He preached at Montreal in 1910, traveled in Canada, the United States, and Alaska, and lectured in China, Japan, Italy and France. In 1915 he became chaplain to Catholic troops of the British expeditionary army on the Continent (brother of Herbert Cardinal Vaughan, see below)
Herbert Cardinal Vaughan, Archbishop of Westminster (brother of Fr Bernard Vaughan, see above)
Sir George Wakeman, physician to Queen Catherine of Braganza, accused by Titus Oates of trying to poison her husband Charles II, subsequently acquitted
George Herbert Walker, banker and businessman; President of the United States Golf Association–the Walker Cup (the famous biennial golf match) acquired Walker's namesake for his role in the event's creation; descendants include grandson George H. W. Bush and great-grandson George W. Bush, both of whom served as President of the United States
General Vernon A. Walters, General, United States Army; Deputy Director of the CIA; U.S. Ambassador to the United Nations
Sir Christopher Waterlow, Camera Supervisor at QVC UK; Honorary Fellow of the Institute of Videography
Edmund Waterton, antiquary, formed a collection of rings, awarded the Order of Christ (the highest Papal decoration)
Charles Waterton, Naturalist and creator of the world's first national park

Fr James Waterworth, missionary priest who published "Faith of Catholics", a translation of the canons and decrees of the Council of Trent and of Veron's "Rule of Faith"; his last book, England and Rome was on the relations of the Popes to post-Reformation England.  He was made canon and later provost of Nottingham.
Sir Frederick Weld, New Zealand politician; elected to the first House of Representatives; member of the Stafford Executive; Native Affairs Minister; Prime Minister; Governor of West Australia; Governor of Tasmania; Governor of the Straits Settlements; Knight of the Order of St Pius.
Christopher Wenner, journalist and television presenter for the BBC's Blue Peter programme and an overseas correspondent for ITN's Channel 4 News; under the nom-de-guerre "Max Stahl",Graphic images flood out of Syria. Why no world uproar?, The Christian Science Monitor, 1 February 2012 Wenner has become a war correspondent, whose footage brought the plight of the East Timorese to world attention; winner of the Rory Peck Award for his journalism.
George J. Wigley, architect, journalist, co-founder of the Society of St Vincent de Paul, co-founder of the Peterspence Association, awarded the Cross of St Gregory the Great by Pius IX.
Douglas Wilmer, British actor (primarily associated with the role of Sherlock Holmes)
Paul Woodroffe, stained glass artist and book illustrator, produced the 15 windows for the Lady Chapel of St. Patrick's Cathedral (NYC)
Hugh Wooldridge, theatre and television director and producer
Sir Thomas Wyse, Member of Parliament (Liberal and second Irish Roman Catholic), advocate of Catholic Emancipation; Junior Lord of the Treasury; Secretary to the Board of Control; British Ambassador to the Kingdom of Greece

Miscellaneous accolades
The following were awarded to former Stonyhurst pupils:
1914-1918 war:
30 Distinguished Service Orders
77 Military Crosses
4 Distinguished Flying Crosses
2 Air Force Crosses

Second World War:
12 Distinguished Service Orders
8 Distinguished Service Crosses, one with Bar
30 Military Crosses
9 Distinguished Flying Crosses
4 Croix de Guerre, one with Palm
1 Air Force Cross

Six O.S. were killed serving in the Second Boer War.

Fictional alumnus
Lord Brideshead, the Earl of Brideshead, heir to the Marquess of Marchmain; "Bridey" – fictional character from Evelyn Waugh's Brideshead Revisited''.

See also
College of St Omer
Stonyhurst College
Stonyhurst Saint Mary's Hall
List of alumni of Jesuit educational institutions
Society of Jesus
St Ignatius, founder of the Jesuits

References

Stonyhurst College
 
Stonyhurst College
People Educated at Stonyhurst College